The Battle of Hiệp Hòa was a minor battle of the Vietnam War. On the night of November 22, 1963, an estimated 500 Viet Cong (VC) fighters overran the Hiệp Hòa Special Forces Camp, resulting in four American personnel missing. South Vietnamese commando units and the American Special Forces resisted heavily using machine guns but were overwhelmed by the arrival of a People's Army of Vietnam mortar unit. It was the first CIDG camp to be overrun during the war. Isaac Camacho, one of the four missing Americans, later became the first American to escape from a VC POW camp.

References

Battles and operations of the Vietnam War
Battles involving the United States
Battles and operations of the Vietnam War in 1963
November 1963 events in Asia
History of Long An Province